Stanley Morris Cubberley (18 July 1882–1933) was an English footballer who played in the Football League for Leeds City.

References

1882 births
1933 deaths
English footballers
Association football midfielders
English Football League players
Enfield F.C. players
Cheshunt F.C. players
Crystal Palace F.C. players
Leeds City F.C. players
Swansea City A.F.C. players
Manchester United F.C. players